Asperdaphne bela is a species of sea snail, a marine gastropod mollusk in the family Raphitomidae.

Description
The typical shell-length is 2.4 mm, its diameter 1.5 mm.  Lives subtidally and offshore.

(Original description) The shell is small and ventricose. Its color is white with the front half of the body whorl brownish. The shell contains 3½ whorls, including a 1½ whorled protoconch. which is spirally lirate. The subsequent two whorls are rounded, crossed by strong axial ribs, about nine on the body whorl. They follow each other at the suture, and fade away on the base. These ribs are separated by spaces about twice as wide as themselves, and crossed by numerous flattened lirae, which are close together, and slightly corrugate the ribs. The aperture is large, oval, scarcely forming a siphonal canal. Above it forms a round shallow sinus.

Distribution
This marine species is endemic to southeastern Australia and occurs off Tasmania

References

 May, W.L. 1923. An illustrated index of Tasmanian shells: with 47 plates and 1052 species. Hobart : Government Printer 100 pp.

External links
  Hedley, C. 1922. A revision of the Australian Turridae. Records of the Australian Museum 13(6): 213-359, pls 42-56 
 
 Gastropods.com: Asperdaphne (Asperdaphne) bela

bela
Gastropods described in 1922
Gastropods of Australia